Birches Bridge is an area of Codsall, Staffordshire. It is situated to the northwest of Wolverhampton between Bilbrook and Codsall.

Name and origins
Birches Bridge takes its name from The Birches, a large estate first mentioned in court rolls of 1716 and in a Codsall Parish Register of 1730. The estate stood between the present day Birches Road and Lane Green Road. Birch coming from old English braec or brec, meaning a newly cultivated piece of land.

Shops and amenities
Birches Bridge is home to Bilbrook railway station and Birches Bridge Shopping Centre, which features The Flower Shop which was established when the parade of shops was built in 1956, a co-operative supermarket and an Esso petrol station amongst other shops and eateries.

Transport links
The area is serviced by the number 5 Wolverhampton to Codsall National Express West Midlands bus service, and Bilbrook railway station on the Wolverhampton to Shrewsbury line. The railway station was originally known as Birches.

References

South Staffordshire District